Ngāti Tarāwhai is a Māori iwi of the Rotorua area of New Zealand, and a member of the Te Arawa confederation of tribes. The iwi's rohe (tribal area) covers the western shore of Lake Ōkataina. 

The tribe's carving has been noted historically. One of the greatest carvers known today, Wero Tāroi, who was possibly the first Māori carver to incorporate  steel chisels, was of Ngāti Tarāwhai.

Te Arawa FM is the radio station of Te Arawa iwi. It was established in the early 1980s and became a charitable entity in November 1990. The station underwent a major transformation in 1993, becoming Whanau FM. One of the station's frequencies was taken over by Mai FM in 1998; the other became Pumanawa FM before later reverting to Te Arawa FM.

See also
List of Māori iwi

References